The 2014 İstanbul Cup (also known as the TEB BNP Paribas İstanbul Cup for sponsorship reasons) was a women's tennis tournament played on outdoor hard courts. It was the 7th edition of the İstanbul Cup, and was part of the WTA International tournaments of the 2014 WTA Tour. It took place in Istanbul, Turkey, from 14 July through 20 July 2014.  This was the first edition of the tournament since 2010.  The event was not held in 2011–2013 because the WTA Tour Championships were held in İstanbul during those years. Caroline Wozniacki won the singles title.

Points and prize money

Point distribution

Prize money

Singles main-draw entrants

Seeds

 Rankings are as of July 7, 2014.

Other entrants
The following players received wildcards into the singles main draw
  Çağla Büyükakçay
  İpek Soylu
  Caroline Wozniacki

The following players received entry from the qualifying draw:
  Alexandra Dulgheru 
  Ana Konjuh
  Johanna Konta
  Kateryna Kozlova
  Elizaveta Kulichkova 
  Kateřina Siniaková

Withdrawals
Before the tournament
  Andrea Petkovic
  Urszula Radwańska
  Ajla Tomljanović
  Yanina Wickmayer

Retirements
  Alexandra Dulgheru (shoulder injury)
  Monica Niculescu

Doubles main-draw entrants

Seeds 

 1 Rankings as of July 7, 2014.

Other entrants 
The following pairs received wildcards into the main draw:
  Bojana Jovanovski /  Francesca Schiavone
  Melis Sezer /  İpek Soylu

Finals

Singles

  Caroline Wozniacki defeated  Roberta Vinci, 6–1, 6–1

Doubles

  Misaki Doi /  Elina Svitolina defeated  Oksana Kalashnikova /  Paula Kania, 6–4, 6–0

References

External links
 Official website

Istanbul Cup
İstanbul Cup
2014 in Turkish tennis
July 2014 sports events in Turkey